Data Storage Technology (DST) is a  wide magnetic tape data storage format created by Ampex in 1992. The DST format was also made by Ampex as a digital videotape format, DCT, using the same design of cassette. DST  is relatively high capacity and high speed, especially compared to other tape technologies available in the 1990s.  There are 3 standard tape cartridges sizes compatible with each generation, "Small", "Medium", and "Large".

Generations

External links
 Entry in Computer Desktop Encyclopedia (Search for "DST")
 Ampex's History (Search for "DST")

Computer storage tape media